Svratka is a town in Žďár nad Sázavou District in the Vysočina Region of the Czech Republic. It has about 1,400 inhabitants.

Administrative parts
Town parts of Česká Cikánka, Moravská Cikánka and Moravská Svratka are administrative parts of Svratka.

Notable people
Josef Věromír Pleva (1899–1985), writer

References

External links

Cities and towns in the Czech Republic
Populated places in Žďár nad Sázavou District